The Baby Huey Show is an animated television series which ran in syndication during the 1994–95 and 1995-96 TV seasons. The show featured the Famous Studios/Harvey Comics character Baby Huey. 26 episodes were produced by combining old theatrical Famous Studios cartoons and new made for TV shorts. These were the first Baby Huey cartoons since the 1959 theatrical cartoon Huey's Father's Day. Huey was voiced by Sid Raymond, reprising his role from the original Famous shorts.

The first season was produced by Carbunkle Cartoons, a company which did animation on selected episodes of The Ren and Stimpy Show for seasons one and two. Each episode usually consisted of a new 8 minute short followed by two classic Harveytoons (the first featuring Herman and Katnip and the second featuring Baby Huey) and a clip from another classic Harveytoon.

The second season was produced by Film Roman, and thus had different writers and directors (Pat Ventura chief amongst them). Joe Alaskey was cast in the title role, instead of original star Sid Raymond from the first season who had originated the voice in 1949. In addition to a new Baby Huey short, each episode contained an uncredited "Richie Rich Gems" vignette, featuring Richie Rich with guest appearances by Reggie, Tiny, Pee-Wee, Freckles, Cadbury, Professor Keenbean, Gloria and Dollar. One Baby Huey television cartoon from the first season was also rebroadcast during each second-season episode. Each episode also contained a theatrical Baby Huey or Herman and Katnip cartoon from Famous Studios.

Plot
A large, dimwitted baby duck wreaks havoc on those who he comes in contact with as his attempts to help and or play result in hilarious consequences. Huey is often unaware of the havoc he is causing, maintaining an innocence even as a hungry fox attempts - and fails - to eat him.

Voice actors

Main
 Sid Raymond as Baby Huey (season 1)
 Joe Alaskey as Baby Huey (season 2), additional voices
 Michael Sicoly as Papa (season 1), additional voices
 Kevin Schon as Papa (season 2)
 Billy West as the Fox (season 1), additional voices
 Greg Burson as the Fox (season 2)
 Maxine Miller as Mama (season 1)
 Russi Taylor as Mama (season 2)

Additional voices
 Orlando Ashley (season 2)
 Kathleen Barr (season 1)
 Nancy Casalese (season 1)
 Garry Chalk (season 1)
 Mandy Cumbie (season 1)
 Phil Hayes
 Matt Hill (season 1)
 Bob Jaques (season 1)
 Terry Klassen (season 1)
 Scott McNeil (season 1)
 Rob Marson (season 1)
 John Payne (season 1)
 Thurl Ravenscroft (season 2)
 Will Ryan (season 1)

Episodes

Series overview

Season 1 (1994)

Season 2 (1995)

References

External links
 
 

1990s American animated television series
1994 American television series debuts
1995 American television series endings
American children's animated comedy television series
Animated television series about children
Animated television series about ducks
First-run syndicated television programs in the United States
Television series by Claster Television
Television series created by Bob Jaques